Alto de L'Angliru is a steep mountain road in Asturias, near La Vega-Riosa, in northern Spain. It is considered one of the most demanding climbs in professional road bicycle racing and is often used in the Vuelta a España stage race.

Origins
The organizers of the Vuelta a España wanted a mountain to rival the Alpe d'Huez and Mont Ventoux in the Tour de France and the Mortirolo Pass in the Giro d'Italia, which would go on in 2003 to add one of the world's most demanding climbs, the Zoncolan, in an attempt to compete with the new Spanish climb.  The Angliru was first included in 1999, on stage eight from León. José María Jiménez won after catching Pavel Tonkov a kilometer from the finish.

Details
It is near 24% at its steepest. The first  are an average of 7.6%— stiff but not over-demanding for world-class cyclists. The sixth kilometre lessens to 2.1% and has a short descent. The last half of the climb is more severe. From six kilometres to the summit, it  averages 13.1%. There are two later ramps at 18% to 21% (sources vary).

Controversy
During stage 15 in  2002, riders climbed the Angliru in rain. Team cars stalled on the steepest part, some unable to restart because their tires slipped on messages painted by fans. Riders were caught behind them and others had to ride with flat tires because mechanics could not reach them. David Millar crashed three times and protested by handing in his race number a metre from the line. The judges ruled he had not finished the stage and he left the race. He regretted his temper – he had been ninth – and apologised to his team.

Opinions
The manager of the Kelme team, Vicente Belda, said: "What do they want? Blood? They ask us to stay clean and avoid doping and then they make the riders tackle this kind of barbarity." Patrice Halgand, a French rider, said the Union Cycliste Internationale had rules about the distance and frequency of races but not about hills. He said:

[The rules] haven't foreseen everything. The proof. I find it ridiculous to go looking for a hill on a narrow road, dangerous and winding, because it's not like that, that you change the way a race develops [Ce n'est pas cela qui va changer les données de la course]. There are other cols than the Angliru to climb in the Vuelta. Differences in the riders would show just as well on a pass that's less steep and on a wider road. It would also be better for spectacle, because on the Angliru the guys go too pitifully for the climb to have any sporting interest. Even the winner goes up in slow motion. There's no attacking. From front to rear, everyone just gets up as best he can.

The former climber Charly Mottet approved the climb. He said:

I saw the climb of the Angliru and I thought it was good for cycling. I watched on television and saw a superb race. I am for these difficulties out of the normal, these extreme gradients. The steepness doesn't shock me because there is always a solution in choosing the right gears. The organiser should give an idea of what's needed in the race bible. I would see it, as a former rider (and organiser of the Dauphiné Libéré) as my duty.

Stage winners and fastest ascent times

† Juan José Cobo is alternately recorded as having a time of 43:53, Roberto Heras is alternately recorded as having a time of 43:57 
^ On 18 July 2019, the UCI confirmed the suspension of Cobo after being found guilty of an anti-doping violation on his biological passport between 2009 and 2011, stripping him of his stage win.  Wout Poels, who finished second on the stage, was elevated to stage winner as a result.

See also
 List of highest paved roads in Europe
 List of mountain passes

References

External links
Climbbybike.com Information on and profile of the Angliru
Altimetry of the climb.

Climbs in cycle racing in Spain
Geography of Asturias
Sport in Asturias